Coleophora tundrosa is a moth of the family Coleophoridae. It is found in southern Russia.

References

tundrosa
Moths of Europe
Moths described in 1991